Alexander Vladimirovich Volkov (3 March 1967 – 19 October 2019) was a Russian professional tennis player.

Tennis career

Volkov finished runner-up in three tournaments over 1989 and 1990; in the latter year he defeated World No. 1 Stefan Edberg in straight sets in the first round of the US Open. Volkov won his first top-level professional singles title in 1991 at Milan. At Wimbledon that year, he lost a close match in the fourth round to the eventual tournament champion Michael Stich, 4–6, 6–3, 7–5, 1–6, 7–5 despite winning the same number of games as Stich overall in the match, which hinged on a lucky shot hit by the German when he was trailing 3–5 in the final set. As Volkov served for the match, with the score at 30–15 in his favour, a shot hit by Stich was heading out, but the ball made contact with the inside edge of the top of the net post, sailed over Volkov's head, and landed inside the line, sparing the German from having to face two successive match-points during Volkov's service game, and bringing the scoreline instead to 30–30. Stich went on to take the game; and subsequently Volkov would not win another.

Volkov was runner-up in three tournaments in 1992 and won his second title in 1993 in Auckland. Later in 1993, Volkov defeated Björn Borg in the first round of the Kremlin Cup in Moscow, in a match which proved to be the last of Borg's career. Volkov won the Kremlin Cup a year later in 1994 to claim his third (and final) career title. He reached one more final in 1997 in Shanghai.

His best Grand Slam singles performance was reaching the semifinals of the 1993 US Open, where he defeated Jonathan Stark, Kevin Ullyett, Amos Mansdorf, Chuck Adams and Thomas Muster before losing to Pete Sampras.

Volkov was part of the Russian team that reached the final of the Davis Cup in 1994. He won singles rubbers over Patrick Rafter of Australia in the first round and Michael Stich of Germany in the semifinals. However, he lost both his singles rubbers in the final as Russia was defeated by Sweden 4–1.

Volkov retired from the professional tour in 1998. His career-high singles ranking was world No. 14 in 1994. His career prize-money earnings totalled $3,362,786.

He was Marat Safin's coach before the duo split in July 2007.

ATP career finals

Singles: 11 (3 titles, 8 runner-ups)

Doubles: 3 (3 runner-ups)

ATP Challenger and ITF Futures finals

Singles: 1 (1–0)

Performance timeline

Singles

Junior Grand Slam finals

Doubles: 1 (1 runner-up)

Top 10 wins

References

External links
 
 
 
 
 

1967 births
2019 deaths
Olympic tennis players of the Soviet Union
Sportspeople from Kaliningrad
Russian male tennis players
Soviet male tennis players
Tennis players at the 1988 Summer Olympics